Table tennis at the 2012 Summer Paralympics in London took place from Thursday 30 August to Saturday 8 September 2012 at ExCeL Exhibition Centre. 276 athletes, 174 men and 102 women, competed in 29 events. Table tennis events have been held at the Paralympics since the first Games in Rome in 1960.

Events
Twenty-nine events were contested. The events were men's and women's team and individual competitions for the various disability classifications.

Participating nations

Medal summary

Medal table

Men's events

Women's events

See also
Table tennis at the 2012 Summer Olympics

References

 
2012 Summer Paralympics events
2012
Table tennis competitions in the United Kingdom
2012 in table tennis